The following Union Army units and commanders fought in the Battle of Jonesborough of the American Civil War on August 31-September 1, 1864. The Confederate order of battle is listed separately.

Abbreviations used

Military rank
 MG = Major General
 BG = Brigadier General
 Col = Colonel
 Ltc = Lieutenant Colonel
 Maj = Major
 Cpt = Captain
 Lt = Lieutenant

Other
 w = wounded
 mw = mortally wounded
 k = killed

Military Division of the Mississippi
MG William T. Sherman

Headquarters
 Chief of Artillery: BG William F. Barry
 Chief of Staff: Col Joseph D. Webster

Escort
 7th Company, Ohio Sharpshooters: Lt William McCory

Army of the Cumberland

MG George Henry Thomas

Headquarters
 Chief of Staff: BG William D. Whipple
 Chief of Artillery: BG John M. Brannan

IV Corps

MG David S. Stanley

XIV Corps

BG Jefferson C. Davis

Cavalry Corps
BG Washington Elliott, Chief of Cavalry, Army of the Cumberland

Army of the Tennessee

MG Oliver O. Howard

XV Corps

MG John A. Logan

XVI Corps

BG Thomas E. G. Ransom

XVII Corps

MG Francis P. Blair, Jr.

Notes

References
Eicher, John H., and Eicher, David J., Civil War High Commands, Stanford University Press, 2001, .
U.S. War Department, The War of the Rebellion: a Compilation of the Official Records of the Union and Confederate Armies, U.S. Government Printing Office, 1880–1901.

American Civil War orders of battle
Atlanta campaign